Robert Wojciech Szopiński (born February 15, 1961) is a former Polish ice hockey player and currently is a coach. He played for the Poland men's national ice hockey team at the 1984 Winter Olympics in Sarajevo, the 1988 Winter Olympics in Calgary, and the 1992 Winter Olympics in Albertville.

References

External links

1961 births
Living people
Boxers de Bordeaux players
Ice hockey players at the 1984 Winter Olympics
Ice hockey players at the 1988 Winter Olympics
Ice hockey players at the 1992 Winter Olympics
Olympic ice hockey players of Poland
People from Nowy Targ
Polish ice hockey defencemen
Podhale Nowy Targ players